Surf School is a 2006 American teen sex comedy written and directed by Joel Silverman and starring Corey Sevier, Laura Bell Bundy, Harland Williams, and Sisqó.  The screenplay concerns a group of misfits who must learn to surf in one week so they can compete in the championships.

Plot 
After Jordan transfers from the East Coast to a California high school, he finds himself a social outcast because he cannot surf.  Jordan organizes several other misfits into a team, and they set off for Costa Rica to learn how to surf from former surfing star Rip, who is now an alcoholic.  With only one week until the championship begins, they must learn all they can from Rip in order to face the school bully, Tyler.

Cast 
 Corey Sevier as Jordan
 Laura Bell Bundy as Doris
 Harland Williams as Rip
 Sisqó as Mo
 Lee Norris as Larry
 Miko Hughes as Taz
 Eriko Tamura as Chika
 Taylor Negron as Boris
 Diane Delano as Tillie
 Ryan Carnes as Tyler
 Cheryl Harrington as Mofika

Production 
Shooting took place in Costa Rica.

Release 
Surf School premiered in Yuma, Arizona, home of executive producer Doyle McCurley, on June 1, 2006.  Lionsgate released the film on DVD in the US on July 17, 2007.

Reception 
Reception has been negative.  Phil Villarreal of the Arizona Daily Star called it "a dumb indie comedy that serves up various sex antics copied from copies of American Pie."  Hock Teh of IGN rated it 1/10 stars and wrote that the film borrows the least funny elements from much better comedies.  Noah Davis of PopMatters rated it 4/10 stars and wrote that it may play well to teenagers despite its faults.  Nick Lyons of DVD Talk rated it 0.5/5 stars and called it a poor ripoff of American Pie.  David Johnson of DVD Verdict wrote that it is clichéd and has a nonsensical plot, but it still has "a glimmer of intangible charm".

References

External links 
 
 

2006 films
2000s sex comedy films
American high school films
American independent films
American sex comedy films
American teen comedy films
2000s English-language films
Teen sports films
Films set in California
Films set in Costa Rica
Films shot in Costa Rica
Teen sex comedy films
2000s American films